In natura (Latin for "in Nature") is a phrase to describe conditions present in a non-laboratory environment, to differentiate it from in vivo (experiments on live organisms in a lab) and ex vivo (experiments on cultivated cells isolated from multicellular organisms) conditions.

See also
in vitro
in silico
ex vivo
in situ
in utero
in papyro

References

Latin biological phrases